Ornipholidotos nympha, the western fragile glasswing, is a butterfly in the family Lycaenidae. It is found in Ivory Coast, Ghana and southern Nigeria. Its habitat consists of forests.

References

Butterflies described in 2000
Taxa named by Michel Libert
Ornipholidotos